Lake Donald is a freshwater lakes located on the north slope of the Chiwaukum Mountains, in Chelan County, Washington. The lake is a popular area for hiking, swimming, and fishing Cutthroat trout and Rainbow trout. Self-issued Alpine Lake Wilderness permit required for transit within the Klonaqua Lakes area.

History
Lake Donald is one of the Scottish Lakes, which includes nearby Lake Julius, Loch Eileen and Lake Ethel. The lakes were given names by Albert Hale Sylvester, a topographer for the United States Geological Survey working throughout the North Cascades National Park Complex around 1900, named after female family and friends of Sylvester.

See also 
 List of lakes of the Alpine Lakes Wilderness

References 

Lakes of Chelan County, Washington
Lakes of the Alpine Lakes Wilderness
Okanogan National Forest